The M-15 Motorway, also known as the Hazara Motorway (Hindko/), is a 180 kilometer controlled-access motorway linking the Burhan Interchange near Hasan Abdal in the Punjab province with Haripur, Havelian, Abbottabad, Mansehra, Shinkiari, Battagram, and Thakot in the Khyber Pakhtunkhwa province.

The project is divided into seven packages - the first four (from Burhan to Mansehra) have been completed and were inaugurated on 27 December 2017, 18 November 2019 and last were 3 sections inaugurated in July 2020.The Hasan Abdal and Havelian section was financed by the Asian Development Bank, along with a  grant from the United Kingdom while the Havelian to Shinkiari and Shinkiari to Thakot section of the motorway was financed under China-Pakistan Economic Corridor.

The motorway starts from Havelian, passes through Abbottabad, Mansehra and Shinkiari, and ends at Thakot. The Motorway has five tunnels two at Abbottabad and one each at Battal, Karmong and Mansehra. Up to Haripur, it is a six-lane controlled-access while from Havelian to Mansehra portion has four lanes. The Mansehra-Thakot section has two lanes.

Route

The 180 km-long motorway has six lanes till Haripur, after which it is a four-lane road till Mansehra, and narrows down to two lanes till Thakot.

The route begins at its southernmost extent - the Hazara Expressway interchange, located to the west of Hasan Abdal near the village of Koliya on the banks of the Haro River in northern Punjab province on M-1 motorway. The route tracks northeast, and crosses the Haro River. The Jharikass Interchange will be located immediately east of the river, where the motorway will intersect with the N-35 National Highway at Tareen Abad bus stop, further eastwards is Hattar Industrial Area and on west is the village Char. The motorway will continue eastwards, where it will connect to Haripur Road via the Hattar Interchange near the town of Kot Najibullah. From there, it will continue towards east to N-125 National Highway, which it will connect via the Chechiyan Interchange, 6 miles south of Haripur - thus serving as a bypass and alternative route to the N-35 National Highway which courses directly through the city of Haripur.

The motorway will further continue eastwards for 2 miles before turning northeast towards the town of Shah Maqsood, where the Shah Maqsood Interchange will connect the motorway, for a second time, with the N-35 National Highway. From there the highway will run roughly parallel to the N-35 National Highway as it travels northeast towards the city of Havelian. At the confluence of the Dor River and the Salhad Nalah, the Havelian Interchange will connect the motorway with the N-35 National Highway for direct access to Havelian.

The next phase will extend the motorway further north to Abbottabad via the 1.7 km Shimla tunnel and will continue on to Manshera, Battagram and terminate at Thakot to rejoin the N-35. Imran Khan opened Havelian-Thakot section of Hazara motorway.

Hasan Abdal-Shah Maqsood opening
Former Prime Minister Nawaz Sharif inaugurated the construction of the project on November 29, 2014. Packages one and two comprising a 39.61 stretch of road between Burhan and Serai Saleh were awarded to the Chinese firm Gezhouba Group. Prime Minister Shahid Khaqan Abbasi inaugurated the 47-kilometre stretch from Burhan-Shah Maqsood Interchange to Havelian on 27 December 2017. The Prime Minister unveiled the plaque at Lora Chowk interchange, located 13 kilometres from Haripur.

Shah Maqsood-Mansehra opening

The 40 kilometers long Shah Maqsood to Mansehra section was inaugurated on 18 Nov 2019 by Prime Minister Imran Khan.
Havelian to Thakot Hazara Is divided into three sections which included 47 bridges, 6 tunnels, and 6 service areas i.e. Abbottabad Shimla Hill tunnel 1.75 Kilometer, 2nd tunnel 390 meters, Mansehra Lassan Nawab tunnel 2.75 kilometers.

Mansehra-Thakot opening
In July 2020, the extension of Hazara Motorway was completed with a length of 80 km, linking Mansehra to Thakot. The project was inaugurated on 29 July 2020, by chief minister Khyber Pakhtunkhwa, Mahmood Khan. The Mansehra-Thakot section has cost Rs. 133 billion and is funded under China–Pakistan Economic Corridor. M-15 motorway is Mansehra-Thakot Motorway. Its length is 180 km.

Corruption in the project
Federal Minister of Communication Pakistan Murad Saeed alleged corruption in the project and claimed of 10.2 Billion rupees in recoveries from the contractor. He said that changes were made in the design of the motorway and a suspicious bridge was added in the project that caused the delay and escalated the cost as well.

See also
 Motorways of Pakistan
 Roads in Pakistan
 China-Pakistan Economic Corridor
 National Highways of Pakistan
 Transport in Pakistan
 National Highway Authority

References

External links
 National Highway Authority
 Pakistan National Highways & Motorway Police

35
35
E35